Farther Along may refer to:

 Farther Along (novel), a 2008 novel by Donald Harington
 Farther Along (The Byrds album), 1971
 Farther Along, a 1988 compilation album by The Flying Burrito Brothers
 Farther Along (Spirit album), 1976
 "Farther Along" (song), a 1911 Southern Gospel song